William Hammesfahr is an American neurologist practicing in Florida, who specializes in treating stroke victims. He became a public figure during his involvement in the Terri Schiavo case, during which he examined Schiavo and testified on behalf of her parents.

For stroke victims, Hammesfahr recommends treatment with medicines to open constricted blood vessels and improve blood flow to the affected areas of the brain. He also advocates using Transcranial Doppler testing (TCD) to monitor patients' progress, which involves using sound waves to measure the speed of blood flow through the brain. The concept of dilating blood vessels to treat strokes is not commonly practiced by the medical community.

Dr. William Hammasfahr's patent is described as "A method for treatment of a disease comprising vasospasm or other symptom alleviable by smooth muscle relaxation and a vasodilator delivery system". https://patents.google.com/patent/US20020188202
 
Dr Hammesfahr’s practice was extensively examined and validated in 2003 and 2004 by Florida's Board of Medicine  Special codes were created in the Medicare System for Dr Hammesfahr’s procedures and methods. Dr Hammesfahr’s clinic in Florida is in The Villages.

Education
Dr. Hammesfahr obtained his M.D. in 1982 from Northwestern University and completed his residency training at the Medical College of Virginia in Richmond.

Terri Schiavo

Dr. Hammesfahr became the subject of public controversy in 2002 when he examined Terri Schiavo, the woman at the center of a debate in the United States about euthanasia. Testifying on behalf of Schiavo's parents, Hammesfahr argued that, contrary to majority medical opinion, which stated that Schiavo was in an irreversible persistent vegetative state, she was in a minimally conscious state and might recover. He testified that his treatment might improve her to the point of being able to communicate, a stand debated by the other neurologists involved in the case.

Nobel Prize nomination

Hammesfahr was nominated for a Nobel Prize by U.S. Representative Michael Bilirakis (R-FL)in 1990. Nobel Prize#Selection."  Covered by Fox News and MSNBC hosts Sean Hannity   and Joe Scarborough, and  Pat Robertson on The 700 Club. Nobel Prize Nomination Criteria

Dr. William Hammasfahr's patent is described as "A method for treatment of a disease comprising vasospasm or other symptom alleviable by smooth muscle relaxation and a vasodilator delivery system".

Some believe this nomination was pushed by certain media outlets, but there is no evidence that is accurate. In fact, the reference provided supporting his nomination (reference #4, which by the way is an invalid link), provides strong evidence that this nomination was invented because Michael Bilirakis does not meet the criteria to nominate anyone for the Nobel Prize in Medicine and Physiology. Nominations for this award, as opposed to the Nobel Peace Prize, are restricted to a select group of people as per the Nobel guidelines: "Candidates eligible for the Medicine Prize are those nominated by nominators who have received an invitation from the Nobel Committee to submit names for consideration." One of the key determinants in selecting nominators is that they also have to be experts in Science and/or Medicine; a politician/lawyer from Florida does not meet the definition. In addition, "the statutes of the Nobel Foundation restrict disclosure of information about the nominations and selecting process for 50 years."  So, if he was nominated, it was for the Nobel Peace Prize which is irrelevant to this topic. He also has zero publications that are cited in PubMed. Consequently, there is no scientific record supporting his eligibility for the Nobel Prize in Medicine and Physiology (or any scientific award).

References

American neurologists
Living people
Terri Schiavo case
Year of birth missing (living people)